Altıkara is a village in the District of Ceyhan, Adana Province, Turkey. It lies near the northern bank of the Ceyhan River just off European Route 90 (Highway 0-52), 14 kilometres to the southwest of Ceyhan city. As of 2011, it had a population of  68 people.

References

Villages in Ceyhan District